The Battle of Kosovo took place on 15 June 1389 between an army led by the Serbian Prince Lazar Hrebeljanović and an invading army of the Ottoman Empire under the command of Sultan Murad Hüdavendigâr. The army under Prince Lazar consisted of his own troops, a contingent led by Branković, and a contingent sent from Bosnia by King Tvrtko I, commanded by Vlatko Vuković. Prince Lazar was the ruler of Moravian Serbia and the most powerful among the Serbian regional lords of the time, while Branković ruled the District of Branković and other areas, recognizing Lazar as his overlord.

Reliable historical accounts of the battle are scarce. The bulk of both armies were wiped out, and Lazar and Murad were killed. However, Serbian manpower was depleted and had no capacity to field large armies against future Ottoman campaigns, which relied on new reserve forces from Anatolia. Consequently, the Serbian principalities that were not already Ottoman vassals, became so in the following years.

Background
Emperor Stefan Uroš IV Dušan "the Mighty" (r. 1331–55) was succeeded by his son Stefan Uroš V "the Weak" (r. 1355–71), whose reign was characterized by the decline of central power and the rise of numerous virtually independent principalities; this period is known as the fall of the Serbian Empire. Uroš V was neither able to sustain the great empire created by his father, nor repulse foreign threats and limit the independence of the nobility; he died childless on 4 December 1371, after much of the Serbian nobility had been destroyed by the Ottomans in the Battle of Maritsa earlier that year. Prince Lazar, ruler of the northern part of the former empire (of Moravian Serbia), was aware of the Ottoman threat and began diplomatic and military preparations for a campaign against them.

After the defeat of the Ottomans at Pločnik (1386) and Bileća (1388), Murad I, the reigning Ottoman sultan, moved his troops from Philippoupolis to Ihtiman (modern Bulgaria) in the spring of 1388. From there they traveled across Velbužd and Kratovo (modern North Macedonia). Though longer than the alternative route through Sofia and the Nišava Valley, this led the Ottoman forces to Kosovo, one of the most important crossroads in the Balkans. From Kosovo, they could attack the lands of either Prince Lazar or Vuk Branković. Having stayed in Kratovo for a time, Murad and his troops marched through Kumanovo, Preševo, and Gjilan to Pristina, where he arrived on June 14.

While there is less information about Lazar's preparations, he gathered his troops near Niš, on the right bank of the South Morava. His forces likely remained there until he learned that Murad had moved to Velbužd, whereupon he moved across Prokuplje to Kosovo. This was the best place he could choose as a battlefield, as it gave him control of all the routes that Murad could take. The historiographical examination of the battle is challenging. No first-hand accounts from participants in the battle exist. Contemporary sources are written from widely diverging points of view and not much is discussed in them about battle tactics, army size and other battleground details.

Army composition
Estimates about army size vary, but the Ottoman army was larger. It is likely that the army led by Lazar had 12,000/15,000 to 20,000 troops against 27,000 - 30,000 led by Murad. A higher estimate places the size of Murad's army up to 40,000 and Lazar's up to 25,000 troops. Ottoman historian Mehmed Neşri who authored the first detailed report in Ottoman historiography about the battle of Kosovo in 1521 represents the Ottoman imperial narrative. As an Ottoman Sultan died before or during the battle, the size of the Christian army is presented as significantly larger in Ottoman sources. Neşri placed it at around 500,000, double the size of the Ottoman army.  Regardless of the exact army size, the battle of Kosovo was one of the large battles of late medieval times. In comparison, in the battle of Agincourt (1415) even by assuming the higher estimate of army size as correct, around 10,000 less soldiers were engaged.

Murad's army included no more than 2,000 Janissaries, The Ottoman army was supported by auxiliary troops from the Anatolian Turkoman Beylik of Isfendiyar. Murad's army may have also included Christians: Catalans, Greeks and Italians.

Lazar's army included large contingents from his principality and that of Vuk Branković. Along with Serb troops, a Christian coalition from nearby Christian principalities and kingdoms formed. Bosnians, Albanians, Bulgarians, Greeks and Hungarians fought in the army led by Lazar. Tvrtko I of Bosnia had concluded an anti-Ottoman defensive pact with Lazar and Vuk Branković and sent Vlatko Vuković as commander of the Bosnian forces in Kosovo. Groups of crusaders linked to the Knights of Rhodes under a Domine Johanne Bano are mentioned as fighting in the battle in Annales Forolivienses. Domine Johanne Bano most probably refers to John of Palisna, although identification with a John Horvath has also been proposed. Dhimitër Jonima, Teodor II Muzaka, Andrea Gropa and other Albanian aristocrats have been suggested as participants in the battle. Of those, Teodor Muzaka verifiably fought and died in the battle. Himariotes and other Albanians from Epirus and the coast participated at the Battle of Kosovo. Based on Neşri's account, Đurađ II Balšić has also been linked to the Christian coalition which fought in the battle of Kosovo. The hypothesis about his participation is considered to be "almost entirely false" as he had become an Ottoman vassal; he was in hostility with Lazar's ally Tvrtko I; and at the time of the battle he was most likely in Ulcinj.

Troop deployment

The armies met at the Kosovo field. Murad headed the Ottoman army, with his sons Bayezid on his right and Yakub on his left. Around 1,000 archers were in the front line in the wings, backed up by azap and akinci; in the front center were Janissaries, behind whom was Murad, surrounded by his cavalry guard; finally, the supply train at the rear was guarded by a small number of troops. One of the Ottoman commanders was Pasha Yiğit Bey.
 
The Serbian army had Prince Lazar at its center, Vuk on the right, and Vlatko on the left. At the front of the army were the heavy cavalry and archer cavalry on the flanks, with the infantry to the rear. While parallel, the dispositions of the armies were not symmetrical, as the Serbian center had a broader front than the Ottoman center.

Battle

Serbian and Turkish accounts of the battle differ, making it difficult to reconstruct the course of events. It is believed that the battle commenced with Ottoman archers shooting at Serbian cavalry, who then made ready for the attack. After positioning in a wedge formation, the Serbian cavalry managed to break through the Ottoman left wing, but were not as successful against the center and the right wing.

The Serbs had the initial advantage after their first charge, which significantly damaged the Ottoman wing commanded by Yakub Çelebi. When the knights' charge was finished, light Ottoman cavalry and light infantry counterattacked and the Serbian heavy armor became a disadvantage. In the center, Serbian troops managed to push back Ottoman forces, except for Bayezid's wing, which barely held off the Bosnians commanded by Vlatko Vuković. Vuković thus inflicted disproportionately heavy losses on the Ottomans. The Ottomans, in a ferocious counterattack led by Bayezid, pushed the Serbian forces back and then prevailed later in the day, routing the Serbian infantry. Both flanks still held, with Vuković's Bosnian troops drifting toward the center to compensate for the heavy losses inflicted on the Serbian infantry.

Historical facts say that Vuk Branković saw that there was no hope for victory and fled to save as many men as he could after Lazar was captured. In traditional songs, however, it is said that he betrayed Lazar and left him to die in the middle of battle, rather than after Lazar was captured and the center suffered heavy losses.

Sometime after Branković's retreat from the battle, the remaining Bosnian and Serb forces yielded the field, believing that a victory was no longer possible.

As the battle turned against the Serbs, it is said that one of their knights, later identified as Miloš Obilić, pretended to have deserted to the Ottoman forces. When brought before Murad, Obilić pulled out a hidden dagger and killed the Sultan by slashing him, after which the Sultan's bodyguards immediately killed him.

Aftermath

Early reports 

The event of the battle quickly became known in Europe. Not much attention was paid to the outcome in these early rumors which circulated, but they all focused on the fact that the Ottoman Sultan had been killed in the battle. Some of the earliest reports about the battle come from the court of Tvrtko of Bosnia who in separate letters to the senate of Trogir (August 1) and the council of Florence claimed that he had defeated the Ottomans in Kosovo. The response of the Florentines to Tvrtko (20 October 1389) is an important historical document as it confirms that Murad was killed during the battle and that it took place on June 28 (St. Vitus day/Vidovdan). The killer is not named, but it was one of 12 Serbian noblemen who managed to break through the Ottoman lines:

Another Italian account, Mignanelli's work of 1416, asserted that it was Lazar who killed the Ottoman sultan.

Geopolitical consequences

Both armies were destroyed in the battle. Both Lazar and Murad lost their lives, and the remnants of their armies retreated from the battlefield. Murad's son Bayezid killed his younger brother, Yakub Çelebi, upon hearing of their father's death, thus becoming the sole heir to the Ottoman throne. The Serbs were left with too few men to defend their lands effectively, while the Turks had many more troops in the east. The immediate effect of the depletion of Serbian manpower was a shift in the stance of Hungarian policy towards Serbia. Hungary tried to exploit the effects of battle and expand in northern Serbia, while the Ottomans renewed their campaign in southern Serbia as early as 1390-91. Domestically, the Serbian feudal class in response to these threats split in two factions. A northern faction supported a conciliatory, pro-Ottoman foreign policy as a means of defence of their lands against Hungary, while a southern faction which was immediately threatened by Ottoman expansion sought to establish a pro-Hungarian foreign policy. Consequently, some of the Serbian principalities that were not already Ottoman vassals became so in the following years. These feudal lords - including the daughter of Prince Lazar - formed marriage ties with the new Sultan Bayezid. In the wake of these marriages, Stefan Lazarević, Lazar's son, became a loyal ally of Bayezid, and contributed significant forces to many of Bayezid's future military engagements, including the Battle of Nicopolis. Some Serbian feudal lords continued to fight against the Ottomans and others were integrated in the Ottoman feudal hierarchy. The capture of Smederevo on June 20, 1459 marks the end of medieval Serbian statehood.

Legacy
 

The Battle of Kosovo is particularly important to Serbian history, tradition and national identity.

The day of the battle, known in Serbian as Vidovdan (St. Vitus' day) and celebrated according to the Julian calendar (corresponding to 28 June Gregorian in the 20th and 21st centuries), is an important part of Serb ethnic and national identity, with notable events in Serbian history falling on that day: in 1876 Serbia declared war on the Ottoman Empire (Serbian–Ottoman War (1876–78); in 1881 Austria-Hungary and the Principality of Serbia signed a secret alliance; in 1914 the assassination of Archduke Franz Ferdinand of Austria was carried out by the Serbian Gavrilo Princip (although a coincidence that his visit fell on that day, Vidovdan added nationalist symbolism to the event); in 1921 King Alexander I of Yugoslavia proclaimed the Vidovdan Constitution; in 1989, on the 600th anniversary of the battle, Serbian president Slobodan Milošević delivered the Gazimestan speech on the site of the historic battle.

The Tomb of Sultan Murad, a site in Kosovo Polje where Murad I's internal organs were buried, has gained a religious significance for local Muslims. A monument was built by Murad I's son Bayezid I at the tomb, becoming the first example of Ottoman architecture in the Kosovo territory.

See also
Battle of Dubravnica
Battle of Pločnik
Battle of Bileća
Battle of Kosovo (1448)
Gazimestan
Kosovo curse

Notes and references

Sources

Further reading

External links

1389 in Europe
Conflicts in 1389
Battles of the Ottoman–Serbian Wars
Battles involving the Ottoman Empire
Battles involving Serbia in the Middle Ages
Battles involving the Knights Hospitaller
2nd millennium in Kosovo
14th century in Serbia
1389 in the Ottoman Empire
Battles involving the Kingdom of Bosnia